Martin Lukeš (born 17 November 1978) is a Czech former footballer who played for FC Baník Ostrava as their captain.

Club career
Lukeš played almost his whole Gambrinus liga career for FC Baník Ostrava. In the 2003–04 season, however, when Baník won the league title, Lukeš was at Slavia Prague. The following season he returned to Baník.

In 1997, he won the Talent of the Year award at the Czech Footballer of the Year awards. The following year he made his debut in the Czech national team.

References

External links
 Profile at theplayersagent.com 
 
  
 

1978 births
Living people
Czech footballers
Czech Republic youth international footballers
Czech Republic under-21 international footballers
Czech Republic international footballers
Czech First League players
FC Baník Ostrava players
SK Slavia Prague players
People from Bruntál
Association football midfielders
Sportspeople from the Moravian-Silesian Region